This is a list of notable events in country music that took place in 1947.

Events

Top hits of the year

Number one hits
(As certified by Billboard magazine)

Top Hillbilly (Country) Recordings 1947

Here is a year-end list compiled from The Billboard's Most-Played Folk Records weekly chart of 1947. Records that enter the chart in December of the previous year, or remain on the chart after December of the current year, receive points for their full chart runs. Each week, a score of 15 points is assigned for the no. 1 record, 9 points for no. 2, 8 points for no. 3, and so on, and the total of all weeks determined the final rank.

Births 
 April 2 — Emmylou Harris, country-rock and alternative country-styled singer who enjoyed mainstream success during the 1970s and 1980s.
 May 24 — Mike Reid, football player-turned-singer-songwriter during the 1980s.
 July 22 — Don Henley, member of the country-rock group Eagles.
 September 16 - Sonny LeMaire, member of the 1980s group Exile.
 September 26 — Lynn Anderson, top female country singer of the 1970s; best-remembered for her crossover pop smash, "(I Never Promised You a) Rose Garden" (died 2015).
 November 10 — Dave Loggins, singer-songwriter who wrote a number of successful country songs during the 1980s.
 December 19 — Janie Fricke, 1970s session/backup singer who grew to individual stardom during the early and mid-1980s.

Deaths

Further reading 
 Kingsbury, Paul, Vinyl Hayride: Country Music Album Covers 1947–1989, Country Music Foundation, 2003
 Millard, Bob, Country Music: 70 Years of America's Favorite Music, HarperCollins, New York, 1993
 Whitburn, Joel. Top Country Songs 1944–2005 – 6th Edition. 2005.

References

Country
Country music by year